Brenthia pileae is a species of moth of the family Choreutidae. It was described by Yutaka Arita in 1971. It is found in Japan and Taiwan.

The larvae feed on Pilea petiolaris pseudopetiolaris.

References

Brenthia
Moths described in 1971
Moths of Japan